Arsenura rebeli is a moth of the  family Saturniidae. It is found in the Andes, from Ecuador, south to Bolivia.

The wingspan is 145–150 mm.

One of A. rebeli's close relatives is Arsenura armida, which is also found in Bolivia.

External links
 Species info

Arsenurinae
Moths of South America
Fauna of the Andes
Moths described in 1920